The 2020 Sun Belt Conference football season was the 20th season of college football play for the Sun Belt Conference. The season began September 3, 2020 and concluded December 26, 2020 as part of the 2020–21 NCAA Division I FBS football season. The Sun Belt consists of 10 members in two divisions. The conference released its schedule on February 28, 2020, but numerous changes have been made since as a result of the COVID-19 pandemic.

Previous season

The 2019 season began with Appalachian State and Louisiana topping the preseason media polls for the East and West Divisions, respectively. The season started well for the conference, as week one was headlined by conference member Georgia State upsetting Tennessee of the SEC. The first conference game took place during week four between Georgia State and Texas State, and saw the Bobcats pull out a three-point win in triple overtime. The regular season concluded on week fourteen, with Appalachian State (11–1, 7–1) topping the East Division and Louisiana (10–2, 7–1) topping the West, as predicted. The two teams met in the 2019 Sun Belt Conference Football Championship Game, which was hosted by Appalachian State at Kidd Brewer Stadium in Boone, North Carolina. The hosts prevailed, 45–38.

Sun Belt teams went 3–2 in bowl games, with wins coming from Arkansas State, Appalachian State, and Louisiana.

Preseason
The conference released its preseason media poll and all-conference teams on August 25, 2020.

Preseason media poll
East Division
1. Appalachian State (9) – 49 pts
2. Georgia Southern – 36 pts
3. Troy (1) – 32 pts
4. Georgia State – 20 pts
5. Coastal Carolina – 13 pts
West Division
1. Louisiana (7) – 47 pts
2. Arkansas State (2) – 40 pts
3. South Alabama (1) – 22 pts
4. Texas State – 21 pts
5. Louisiana–Monroe – 20 pts

All-conference preseason teams
Preseason All-Sun Belt

Offensive Player of the Year: Zac Thomas (Senior, Appalachian State quarterback)
Defensive Player of the Year: Carlton Martial (Junior, Troy linebacker)

Head coaches
Appalachian State was the only team to undergo a coaching change from last season; Eliah Drinkwitz departed the program after the conclusion of the regular season to become the head coach at Missouri. Shawn Clark was named interim coach upon his departure, and the interim tag was removed in time for him to coach the Mountaineers to a victory in the 2019 New Orleans Bowl.

Rankings

Schedule

Regular season

Week One

Week Two

Week Three

Week Four

Week Five

Week Six

Week Seven

Week Eight

Week Nine

Week Ten

Week Eleven

Week Twelve

Week Thirteen

Week Fourteen

Week Fifteen

Week Sixteen

Championship Game

Postseason

Bowl Games

Sun Belt records vs Other Conferences
2020–2021 records against non-conference foes:

Regular Season

Sun Belt vs Power Five matchups
This is a list of games the Sun Belt has scheduled versus power conference teams (ACC, Big 10, Big 12, Pac-12, BYU/Notre Dame and SEC). All rankings are from the current AP Poll at the time of the game.

Sun Belt vs Group of Five matchups
The following games include Sun Belt teams competing against teams from the American, C-USA, MAC or Mountain West.

Sun Belt vs FBS independents matchups
The following games include Sun Belt teams competing against FBS Independents, which includes Army, Liberty, New Mexico State, UConn, or UMass.

Sun Belt vs FCS matchups

Awards and honors

Players of the week

Sun Belt Individual Awards
The following individuals received postseason honors as voted by the Sun Belt Conference football coaches at the end of the season

All-conference teams

Ref:

All-Americans

The 2020 College Football All-America Teams are composed of the following College Football All-American first teams chosen by the following selector organizations: Associated Press (AP), Football Writers Association of America (FWAA), American Football Coaches Association (AFCA), Walter Camp Foundation (WCFF), The Sporting News (TSN), Sports Illustrated (SI), USA Today (USAT) ESPN, CBS Sports (CBS), FOX Sports (FOX) College Football News (CFN), Bleacher Report (BR), Scout.com, Phil Steele (PS), SB Nation (SB), Athlon Sports, Pro Football Focus (PFF) and Yahoo! Sports (Yahoo!).

Currently, the NCAA compiles consensus all-America teams in the sports of Division I-FBS football and Division I men's basketball using a point system computed from All-America teams named by coaches associations or media sources.  The system consists of three points for a first-team honor, two points for second-team honor, and one point for third-team honor.  Honorable mention and fourth team or lower recognitions are not accorded any points.  Football consensus teams are compiled by position and the player accumulating the most points at each position is named first team consensus all-American.  Currently, the NCAA recognizes All-Americans selected by the AP, AFCA, FWAA, TSN, and the WCFF to determine Consensus and Unanimous All-Americans. Any player named to the First Team by all five of the NCAA-recognized selectors is deemed a Unanimous All-American.

NFL Draft

The following list includes all Sun Belt Players who were drafted in the 2021 NFL Draft

References

*